Southwest Finnish dialects are Western Finnish dialects spoken in Southwest Finland and Satakunta. 

The Southwest Finnish dialects have pitch accents and Swedish influences,
as well as features from other dialect groups (especially Tavastian). However, features and influences from other Finnish dialect groups are largely absent in the Rauma dialect.

The Southwest Finnish dialects can be divided into two subgroups, Northern and Eastern groups, which in turn can be divided into even smaller groups.  divided the Northern group into three: Rauma, Taivassalo and Masku groups, and the Eastern group into two: Halikko and Coastal groups.

Features

Pronunciation of D 
Standard Finnish /d/ is usually pronounced as /r/. 

The dialects of Rauma and its surroundings also had /ð/ in its place, nowadays this pronunciation has almost completely been displaced by the r-pronunciation. This sound was generally written as a D, which can be seen in place names such as Ihode (originally pronounced as Ihoðe).

Pronunciation of ts 
The standard Finnish consonant cluster ts usually corresponds to tt, e.g.  (forest), instead of standard . In Finland Proper, this is usually subject to consonant gradation, while in Satakunta it is not.

Southern Satakunta and some surroundings also had a /θ/ sound in its place, but like the voiced dental fricative, this sound has almost entirely disappeared. It was affected by consonant gradation in the Rauma area, while in Kokemäki, Huittinen and Kauvatsa it was not.

Diphthongs uo, yö and  
The standard diphthongs uo, yö and ie are generally pronounced as ua, yä and iä, e.g.

This feature is absent from some of the southernmost dialects of the group, however, they appear in most Tavastian and Southern Ostrobothnian dialects.

Geminated consonants 

, Standard Finnish:  'bread' (partitive case)

, Standard Finnish:  'bird' (partitive case)

Inessive ending

, Standard Finnish ''

Imperfect ending

, Standard Finnish:  'I sat'

Shorter words

, Standard Finnish:  'wage'.

Half-long vowels

 I live in Turku

Plural genitive

The plural genitive in Southwestern dialects is "-tten", which is similar to Estonian.

Examples 
Recording of the Southwest dialect in Hinnerjoki (1882)

Example of the Turku dialect

Example of the Rauma dialect

See also 
 Turku
 Tavastian dialects
 South Ostrobothnian dialect

References

External links 
Uutissi Turust (news in the dialect spoken around Turku)

Nortamo seor

Southwestern dialects Incubator plus 
Finnish dialects